Beatallica (known by fans as The Grey Album) is the second E.P. from Beatallica. It contains eight tracks, made from combinations of Beatles and Metallica songs. The gray color of the album cover is a reference to both The Beatles and Metallica's self-titled albums (the former being white and the latter being black, gray being the resulting combination of both colors).

"Blackened the USSR", "Sandman", "Leper Madonna" and "Hey Dude" were re-recorded for the band's first full-length album Sgt. Hetfield's Motorbreath Pub Band. "And I'm Evil", "Got to Get You Trapped Under Ice" and "I Want to Choke Your Band" were re-recorded for their second album Masterful Mystery Tour.

Track listing
Blackened the USSR
Musical References:
 "Blackened"
 "Back in the U.S.S.R."
 "Hey Jude"
Lyrical References:
"Hit the Lights"
Lemmy from the band Motörhead
Sandman
Lyrical References:
"Seek and Destroy"
Don Dokken/Dokken
And I'm Evil
Lyrical References:
"Ain't My Bitch"
"Die, Die My Darling"
"20 Eyes"
The Misfits (Jaymz Lennfield mimics Glenn Danzig's voice, providing backing vocals halfway through the song)
Got to Get You Trapped Under Ice
Lyrical References:
MTV
Bananarama
Leper Madonna
Musical References:
Contains a sample from the infamous online faux-copy of Madonna's American Life
Lyrical References:
"Like a Virgin"
"Like a Prayer"
"Orion"
Hey Dude
Musical References:
"Nothing Else Matters"
Lyrical References:
"Sad but True"
"For Whom the Bell Tolls"
"Eye of the Beholder"
Diamond Head
Kip Winger
New wave of British heavy metal
"Flying V" Guitars
I Want to Choke Your Band
Lyrical References:
Don't Tread on Me
C. C. DeVille (Poison guitarist)
White Lion
Warrant
We Can Hit the Lightz
Lyrical References:
Trixter
No Life 'Til Leather
Musical References:
"Orion" (bass line during the "life is very short" section)

References

Beatallica albums
2004 EPs
2000s comedy albums